Owairaka was a New Zealand parliamentary electorate that existed for one parliamentary term from 1996 to 1999. Located in suburban Auckland, it was held by Helen Clark, who would become Prime Minister of New Zealand immediately after Owairaka was abolished.

Population centres
The 1996 election was notable for the significant change of electorate boundaries, based on the provisions of the Electoral Act 1993. Because of the introduction of the mixed-member proportional (MMP) electoral system, the number of electorates had to be reduced, leading to significant changes. More than half of the electorates contested in 1996 were newly constituted, and most of the remainder had seen significant boundary changes. In total, 73 electorates were abolished, 29 electorates were newly created (including Owairaka), and 10 electorates were recreated, giving a net loss of 34 electorates.

For the 1996 election, the  electorate moved west. The Owairaka electorate gained its north-western area from what previously belonged to New Lynn. The Owairaka electorate took over the complete area that previously belonged to the  electorate. The southern half of the  electorate went to Owairaka as did the western part of the  electorate. The electorate covered a suburban part of the city of Auckland including Avondale, New Windsor, Lynfield, Hillsborough, Three Kings, the southern parts of Mount Eden, and Mount Albert.

History

The southern half of the Owairaka electorate went to the newly established  electorate, whilst the northern half went to the recreated Mount Albert electorate. Clark returned to the Mount Albert electorate, which she continued to represent until her resignation in 2009. From 1999 to 2008, Clark was Prime Minister of New Zealand.

Members of Parliament
Key

Election results

1996 election

References

Historical electorates of New Zealand
Politics of the Auckland Region
1996 establishments in New Zealand
1999 disestablishments in New Zealand